Île aux Coudres Airport  is located  southwest of L'Isle-aux-Coudres, Quebec, Canada.

References

Registered aerodromes in Capitale-Nationale